The Rote Nase (German for "Red Nose") is a mountain of the Swiss Pennine Alps, located east of the Gornergrat in Valais. The summit is 3,251 m (10,666 ft) above sea level. It is located to the Southeast of the town of Zermatt, and features several ungroomed ski runs leading down the mountain. The summit can be accessed using either a T-bar lift running up from lower down the mountain or a cable car running from Hohtälli.

References

External links
Rote Nase on Hikr

Mountains of the Alps
Alpine three-thousanders
Mountains of Valais
Mountains of Switzerland